Secret Zoo (Korean: 해치지않아, lit. I Don't Bully You) is a 2020 South Korean comedy film directed by Son Jae-gon, starring Ahn Jae-hong, Kang So-ra, Park Yeong-gyu, Kim Sung-oh and Jeon Yeo-been. Based on the webtoon I Don't Bully You by Hun, it was released on January 15, 2020 in South Korea and on January 24 in the United States.

Plot

Stuck in a dead-end temp position at a renowned law firm, attorney-at-law Tae Soo (Ahn Jae-Hong) dreams of one day landing a permanent position there. One day, he is given a special job to revitalize a failing zoo. The problem is, there are no animals. Moreover, he has exactly 3 months to do so. With the zookeepers’ help, he comes up with a brilliant idea of having the zookeepers dress up as animals.
 
One by one, the zookeepers put on animal suits and masks and become polar bears, lions, gorillas, and sloths. The new zoo opens and Tae Soo’s polar bear goes viral when a video of him drinking a can of coke hits the internet. Thanks to everyone’s help, the zoo with fake animals is a massive hit and Tae Soo can now go back to the law firm with a permanent job. But before he leaves the zoo, he finds out what his law firm was planning with the zoo. 

Can Tae Soo come up with another brilliant idea to save not only himself but the zookeepers and the zoo?

Cast
 Ahn Jae-hong as Kang Tae-soo
 Kang So-ra as Han So-won
 Park Yeong-gyu as Director Seo
 Kim Sung-oh as Kim Gun-wook
 Jeon Yeo-been as Kim Hae-kyung
 Park Hyuk-kwon as President Hwang
 Seo Hyeon-woo as Secretary Oh
 Jang Seung-jo as Sungmin
 Park Hyung-soo as Barrister Song
 Kim Heung-rae as Black Nose
 Lee Hyun-wook as Min Chul-hyun
 Han Ye-ri as Min Chae-ryung
 Kim Gi-cheon as Representative Go
 Song Duk-ho as Person in audience
 Kim Hyun as Dismissed employee

Production
Principal photography began on October 8, 2018 and filming was completed on January 19, 2019.

Reception

Box office
The film debuted in first place during its opening weekend. However, ticket sales decreased by 77% in its second week.

Critical response
Secret Zoo holds  approval rating on review aggregator website Rotten Tomatoes, based on  reviews.

Michael Rechtshaffen of the Los Angeles Times said that "resistance might not be futile, but to deny oneself the amiably goofy charms of South Korea's Secret Zoo, an inspired family comedy that gives fresh meaning to faux fur, would be a real shame." For Panos Kotzathanasis of HanCinema, "Secret Zoo is a film that aims at providing fun for its audience, and in that regard, it succeeds to the fullest.

See also
 List of 2020 box office number-one films in South Korea

References

External links
 
 

2020 films
2020s Korean-language films
2020 comedy films
South Korean comedy films
Films about animals
Films based on South Korean webtoons
Films set in zoos